Hatta Heritage Village is a reconstruction of a traditional mountain village located in Hatta, in the Al Hajar Mountains, Dubai, United Arab Emirates (UAE).

The mosque and houses within Hatta Heritage Village were originally constructed from materials such as mud, palm tree trunks and fronds (barasti), reeds, and stone. The village consists of 30 buildings, many of which have interior furnishings typical of the UAE in the period prior to development in the 1960s onwards.

The village was opened to the public in February 2001 after extensive renovation, and is currently owned and managed by the Dubai Culture & Arts Authority.

References

External links
 Hatta Heritage Village, Dubai Culture & Arts Authority

2001 establishments in the United Arab Emirates
Former villages
Villages in the United Arab Emirates
Buildings and structures in Dubai
Geography of Dubai
Tourist attractions in Dubai
Open-air museums in the United Arab Emirates
Rural history museums in the United Arab Emirates
Cultural history of the United Arab Emirates